Kabelo Mmono (born 4 February 1980) is a high jumper from Botswana. He won gold medals at the All-Africa Games and the African Championships in Athletics. When he won gold representing Botswana at the 2003 All-Africa Games, his medal ceremony was memorable for his impromptu solo rendition of the national anthem.

He is a former national record holder with 2.20 metres, but in 2006 this record was beaten by Kabelo Kgosiemang.

International competitions

References

External links

1980 births
Living people
Botswana male high jumpers
African Games gold medalists for Botswana
African Games medalists in athletics (track and field)
Athletes (track and field) at the 2003 All-Africa Games